Ihor Andriyovych Duts (born 11 April 1994) is a Ukrainian football defender who plays for Karpaty Lviv.

Career
Duts is a product of the FC Lviv and FC Shakhtar youth sportive schools.

From July 2015 he went on loan for the Ukrainian First League club FC Illichivets Mariupol.

References

External links
 
 

1994 births
Living people
Ukrainian footballers
Ukraine student international footballers
Ukraine under-21 international footballers
Ukraine youth international footballers
Association football defenders
FC Shakhtar-3 Donetsk players
FC Mariupol players
FC Illichivets-2 Mariupol players
FC Rukh Lviv players
FC Okzhetpes players
FC Mynai players
FC Karpaty Lviv players
Ukrainian Premier League players
Ukrainian First League players
Ukrainian Second League players
Kazakhstan First Division players
Ukrainian expatriate footballers
Expatriate footballers in Kazakhstan
Ukrainian expatriate sportspeople in Kazakhstan
Sportspeople from Lviv Oblast
21st-century Ukrainian people